Sam Kitchen (born 6 April 1994) is an Australian rugby union player for Edinburgh in the Pro14. Kitchen's primary position is hooker.

Rugby Union career

Professional career

Kitchen represented  before moving to Scotland to join Ayrshire Bulls. He joined Edinburgh in June 2020.

External links
itsrugby Profile
Edinburgh Rugby Profile

References

1994 births
Living people
Edinburgh Rugby players
Rugby union hookers
Rugby union players from Sydney